In the Name of the Fatherland (Vo imya Rodini) is a 1943 Soviet war film directed by Vsevolod Pudovkin and Dmitriy Vasilyev based on the play Russian People by Konstantin Simonov.

Cast
 Nikolai Kryuchkov - Safonov	
 Yelena Tyapkina - Safonova
 Mikhail Zharov - Globa
 Mariya Pastukhova - Valya
 Olga Zhiznyeva - Mariya Kharitonovna
 Fyodor Kurikhin - Vasin
 Pyotr Alejnikov - Ilyn		
 Vsevolod Pudovkin - German general	
 Boris Poslavsky - Verner
 Aleksandr Rumnyov
 M. Chepel		
 Viktor Kulakov		
 Aleksandra Danilova		
 Ivan Klyukvin		
 Vladimir Gribkov

External links

Mosfilm films
Films directed by Vsevolod Pudovkin
Films directed by Dmitri Vasilyev
Soviet World War II films
World War II films made in wartime
Soviet black-and-white films
Soviet war films
1954 war films